Rachel Sarah Bilson (born August 25, 1981) is an American actress. Born to a Californian show-business family, Bilson made her television debut in 2003, and then landed the role of Summer Roberts on the prime-time drama series The O.C. Bilson made her movie debut in The Last Kiss (2006) and starred in the science-fiction-action film Jumper (2008) with her then-boyfriend Hayden Christensen. From 2011 to 2015, she starred as Zoe Hart on The CW series Hart of Dixie.

Early life
Bilson was born in Los Angeles, the daughter of Janice Stango, a therapist, and Danny Bilson, a writer, director, and producer. She has an older brother and two younger half-sisters, Rosemary and Hattie. Her mother is an Italian-American who was raised Catholic, and her father is Jewish; she has said that she grew up in a "Chrismukkah household".

Bilson's father comes from a show business family; he is the son of Mona (Weichman) and producer-director Bruce Bilson (b. 1928). Her British great-grandfather, George Bilson (1902–1981), who was born into an Ashkenazi Jewish immigrant family in Leeds, England, worked for RKO Pictures after immigrating to the United States, heading the movie trailer department, and her great-grandmother, Hattie Bilson (1907–2004), was a screenwriter whose credits included Pal, Canine Detective (1950). Bilson's classmates at Notre Dame High School in Sherman Oaks, California, included actress Kirsten Dunst, actor Rami Malek, and American Idol runner-up singer Katharine McPhee.

Career

Bilson attended Grossmont College, a community college in a suburb of San Diego, taking her father's advice to pursue a professional acting career. She then made several appearances in commercials, including advertisements for Subway restaurants, Raisin Bran, and Pepto-Bismol.

She made her screen acting debut in early 2003, appearing in one episode of Buffy the Vampire Slayer and 8 Simple Rules for Dating My Teenage Daughter. Bilson was subsequently cast in The O.C., which debuted in August 2003. Her character, Summer Roberts, was initially intended to appear in only a few episodes but became a series regular after a successful run, as Bilson's on-screen romance with Seth Cohen (Adam Brody) became a noted aspect of the series.

At the 2005 Teen Choice Awards, she collected three awards: "Choice Hottie Female", "Choice TV Actress (Drama)", and "Best Onscreen TV Chemistry" (jointly won with Adam Brody). In 2005, Maxim magazine named her sixth in their annual "Hot 100 List"; in 2006, the publication awarded her #14.

The UK edition of FHM Magazine named her 28th in the 2006 100 Sexiest Women in the World list, while the US Edition Ranked her 77th in 2005. Bilson was also named one of People magazine's "World's Most Beautiful People" in 2006. Before appearing in Maxim, Bilson had turned down requests to appear seminude in men's magazines, specifying that she feels that her body "is sacred" and "not there for the whole world to see".

Bilson's first film role was in The Last Kiss, a romantic comedy-drama also starring Zach Braff in 2006. She played a college student who seduces Braff's character. One review of the film noted that Bilson played the role with "surprising depth", although another critic described her role as "Glenn Close in Fatal Attraction as an airhead valley girl with a hot bod".

In late 2006, Bilson was cast in the film Doug Liman's thriller Jumper, as the replacement for actress Teresa Palmer; the film was released on February 14, 2008. She appeared in a two-episode arc on The O.C. creator Josh Schwartz's NBC comedy, Chuck, and in the film New York, I Love You. She appeared in the 100th episode of How I Met Your Mother ("Girls Versus Suits") as Ted Mosby's latest love interest and the Mother's roommate.

In September 2008, she started shooting the indie romantic film Waiting for Forever, directed by James Keach. In September 2009, Bilson appeared as a celebrity guest judge in the third episode of Project Runway (season 6). Bilson starred in the 2011 indie film L!fe Happens. In 2011, Bilson began starring in The CW series Hart of Dixie, executive produced by The O.C. creator Josh Schwartz. On May 7, 2015, the CW officially canceled the show after four seasons. In 2017, Bilson joined the cast of CMT's Nashville which reunites her with her former The O.C. co-star Chris Carmack.

Bilson starred in the ABC drama series Take Two which premiered in June 2018; however, on November 21, 2018, ABC cancelled the series after one season.

In April 2021, Bilson and her former The O.C. co-star Melinda Clarke launched a podcast titled Welcome to the OC, Bitches!. The podcast focuses on the hosts and guests re-watching and discussing episodes of The O.C.. Several notable guests have appeared on the podcast such as Mischa Barton, Adam Brody, Peter Gallagher, Josh Schwartz, Jem, Bonnie Somerville and Elizabeth Gillies.

Fashion design
Bilson has been recognized by several media sources as being a "fashion junkie". She has described herself as having a "vintage" sense of style and has noted Kate Moss and Diane Keaton as inspirations.

Bilson approached DKNY Jeans in late 2007 with a view to design a clothing line with the fashion brand. Together they created Edie Rose. The collection was launched in September 2008. Her idea was to keep fashionable items accessible to young women by keeping the prices of each piece under $100. An advertising image was released in July 2008 which featured Bilson modelling her Edie Rose collection.

Bilson stated that she wanted to keep her fashion line "as separate as possible from Rachel Bilson, the actress. I'm hoping people will appreciate it for the clothes, not the person behind them." Much of her fashion collection was lost when her home was burglarized in May 2009. Bilson's fashions and sense of style made her the unwitting target of the Bling Ring, who burglarized her home on several occasions.

In 2011, Bilson collaborated with her personal stylist, Nicole Chavez, and shoe industry leader Steve Madden, to launch the footwear destination ShoeMint, an "online customized shoe shopping experience".

In 2013, Bilson designed a shirt for Invisible Children.

Personal life
Bilson and Adam Brody, her co-star on The O.C., dated from 2003 to 2006.

After she and Brody broke up, Bilson began a relationship with actor Hayden Christensen, with whom she had co-starred in the film Jumper. By January 2008, the pair had been seen and photographed together around Los Angeles for almost a year, without confirming a relationship. In February 2009, Bilson appeared publicly with what seemed to be an engagement ring, though no official announcement was made. In August 2010, Bilson's representative confirmed there had been an engagement that had since been called off, giving no other details. The two reconciled three months later, and had a daughter in October 2014. Bilson and Christensen separated in September 2017.

Bilson and Christensen are both supporters of the No Kids Policy, a celebrity coalition which seeks to prevent children of celebrities from being photographed without parental consent.

Bilson started dating actor Bill Hader in 2019, ending the relationship less than a year later.

Filmography

Film

Television

References

External links

 
 

1981 births
21st-century American actresses
Actresses from Los Angeles
American film actresses
American people of English-Jewish descent
American people of Italian descent
American television actresses
Grossmont College alumni
Jewish American actresses
Living people
Notre Dame High School (Sherman Oaks, California) alumni